What If God Were the Sun? is a 2007 American television film directed by Stephen Tolkin and starring Lacey Chabert and Gena Rowlands. Written by Janet Dulin Jones and Jamie Pachino, based in part on a novel by John Edward, the film is about a dedicated nurse whose life is disrupted by her father's death. After losing her job, she finds comfort and inspiration in caring for a terminally ill woman with a quick wit and strong faith. What If God Were the Sun? was originally broadcast by Lifetime Television on May 14, 2007.

Plot
Jamie is an ER nurse preparing for her upcoming wedding. When her policeman father unexpectedly dies in a hospital room adjacent to the one in which she's caring for a patient, her grief consumes her life, severely affecting her job performance and her relationship with her fiancé. Not until she meets Melissa, who is facing death from cancer with a sunny outlook and an unwavering faith in God, does Jamie begin to cope with her feelings and question her religious beliefs, including her conviction that the afterlife doesn't exist.

Cast

 Lacey Chabert as Jamie Spagnoletti
 Gena Rowlands as Melissa Eisenbloom
 Sam Trammell as Jeff
 Sarah Rafferty as Rachel Eisenbloom
 Klea Scott as Carmen
 Amanda Brugel as Lupe
 Diana Reis as Katherine
 Kim Roberts as Maricela
 Maria Ricossa as Alma
 Illya Torres-Garner as Raul
 Ernesto Griffith as Captain Herbert
 Yogesh Chotalia as Dr. Browning
 David Stuart Evans as Michael 
 Robert Marshall as Orlando 
 Jan Skene  as Dr. Greenberg

Critical reception
In her review in Variety, Laura Fries said, "Rowlands is easily the best thing about the pic, and faces its many challenges, including cliches and colossally bad dialogue, with her reputation fairly unscathed . . . ultimately even [her] presence can't save the film from its own overwrought emotions and preposterous posthumous allusions. Perhaps the dead are always with us, but they would surely be grateful to miss this one."

Marilyn Moss of The Hollywood Reporter observed, "Its parts don't always mesh or make sense - storywise and otherwise - but anyone who stays with the characters long enough won't come away empty-handed . . . the story [wants] to be too many things and encase too many issues and events. Still, who cares about such small matters if it means getting to watch Gena Rowlands on the screen?"

Nominations
Gena Rowlands was nominated for the Primetime Emmy Award for Outstanding Lead Actress in a Miniseries or Movie and the Screen Actors Guild Award for Outstanding Performance by a Female Actor in a Miniseries or Television Movie for her performance.

References

External links
 
 
 

2007 television films
2007 films
2007 drama films
Lifetime (TV network) films
2000s English-language films